Shear Fear (literally translated "The Millimetres of Horror") is a 1992 Finnish horror film directed by Ilari Nummi. The film set in the city center of Helsinki in the late 1980s summer, where everything starts from the small fears of everyday life, moving straight towards an area distorted by the terror. The film's actors include Tiina Tenhunen and Katja Krohn.

The film was screened at the Espoo Ciné International Film Festival in 1992 and at the Tampere Film Festival in 1993.

Premise 
Marja Sauri (Tiina Tenhunen), who lives in Helsinki at the end of the 1980s, is going to the store to replace defective garden shears with new ones. Along the way, she collides with a woman (Katja Krohn) on the street who Marja insults in anger. Within a day, Marja begins to see strange delusions about the same woman she encountered earlier.

Cast 
 Tiina Tenhunen as Marja Sauri
 Katja Krohn as a woman
 Tarja-Tuulikki Tarsala as Marja's mother
 Markku Huhtamo as hardware store seller
 Matti Onnismaa as staff manager
 Hannu Kivioja as Mikko
 Leea Klemola as Leena Lindholm

Reception 
The film received favorable reviews when it was released. In March 1992, Tarmo Poussu evaluated the film in Ilta-Sanomat, praising the film: "The film deftly picks up the anxieties of everyday life in its story and Katja Krohn very effectively outlines her wordless role as a hostile woman." However, Poussu also found flaws in the film: “Still, Shear Fear remain just an exercise. Its realistic and fantastic ingredients don’t always articulate.”

In the opinion of Pertti Avola of Helsingin Sanomat, the film was “a controlled and safe job in all respects. It lives and breathes perfectly and retains its atmosphere well. Shear Fear aren't dug very deep into the subject or the people, but it might have shattered the film too much.”

References

External links 

Finnish horror films
1992 horror films
Fiction set in the 1980s